Lingiyadih is a census town in Bilaspur district in the Indian state of Chhattisgarh.

Demographics
 India census, Lingiyadih had a population of 15,769. Males constitute 51% of the population and females 49%. Lingiyadih has an average literacy rate of 65%, higher than the national average of 59.5%: male literacy is 73%, and female literacy is 57%. In Lingiyadih, 16% of the population is under six years of age.

Ligniyadih is satellite town of Bilaspur, which was once a village located just across Arpa River flowing across Bilaspur town.

For many years, there was a large brick-kiln owned by Mulji Jagmal Sawaria, who had laid a private narrow gauge line in year 1935 for transportation of bricks across Arpa River over a railway-bridge built by him connecting kiln to his work office at Jagmal Chowk in Bilaspur. This railway line was dismantled in 1948.

References

Cities and towns in Bilaspur district, Chhattisgarh